Scott Franzke (born March 6, 1972) is an American sportscaster, best known as the radio play-by-play voice of the Philadelphia Phillies.

Career
Franzke's career began as a studio host for the now-defunct Prime Sports Radio Network (now Fox Sports Radio) in 1994 which led him three years later to be the host of the Texas Rangers radio pre- and post-game shows 1997–98.  He honed his play-by-play skills as the voice of the Kane County Cougars from 1999 to 2001, and covered the 2000 Summer Olympics for Sporting News Radio.  He returned to the Rangers to reassume the pre and post game broadcasting duties and also filled in on play-by-play from 2002 to 2005.

In 2006, he came to the Phillies to take over those same duties when Tom McCarthy was hired away from the Phillies by the New York Mets, their National League Eastern Division rivals (McCarthy returned to the Phillies broadcasting team in 2008).  Franzke worked the fifth and sixth innings in 2006 with Larry Andersen.  In 2007, Franzke assumed more play-by-play duties, replacing Scott Graham in the broadcast booth, turning over pre- and post-game duties to Jim Jackson.  In 2008 and the first month of the 2009 season, Franzke called play-by-play in innings 1-3 and 5-9 with Andersen, while Harry Kalas joined Andersen for play-by-play in the fourth.  After the death of Kalas, Franzke assumed play-by-play duties for all nine innings for the remainder of the 2009 season. Until 2020, Franzke called innings 1-3 and 6-9 during home games (with Jackson taking over for innings 4-5) while continuing to call all nine during away games and home games when Jackson was unavailable due to his work as the television play-by-play voice of the Philadelphia Flyers. Starting in 2021, Franzke once again called all 9 innings for every game.

Franzke's contract with the Phillies ended after the 2022 World Series. On February 13, 2023, the Phillies announced they reached a long-term deal with Franzke.

Memorable calls

Personal life
He is a graduate of Southern Methodist University (1994) with a journalism degree.

He currently resides in Philadelphia.

References

External links
 List of Phillies broadcasters

1972 births
Living people
American radio sports announcers
Major League Baseball broadcasters
Minor League Baseball broadcasters
People from Dallas
People from Somers Point, New Jersey
Philadelphia Phillies announcers
Southern Methodist University alumni
Texas Rangers (baseball) announcers